The 1917 West Perthshire by-election was held on 21 February 1917.  The by-election was held due to the incumbent Conservative MP, Lord Tullibardine succeeding as Duke of Atholl.  It was won by the Conservative candidate Archibald Stirling who was unopposed due to a War-time electoral pact.

References

West Perthshire by-election
1910s elections in Scotland
Politics of Perth and Kinross
West Perthshire by-election
West Perthshire by-election
Perthshire, West
Unopposed by-elections to the Parliament of the United Kingdom (need citation)